"Shotgun" is a song by Dutch electronic trio Yellow Claw, featuring vocals by Dutch singer Rochelle Perts (credited under her mononymous stage name Rochelle). It was released in November 2013 as a single through Spinnin' Records. It reached the top 10 in the Netherlands and the top 20 in Belgium.

The song received remixes by DJ Quintino and LNY TNZ on the Spinnin' Records sublabel SPRS.

Charts

Weekly charts

Year-end charts

References 

2013 songs
2013 singles
Yellow Claw (DJs) songs
Spinnin' Records singles